Anke Marchl (born 28 May 1967) is a German former professional tennis player.

On 27 April 1992, Marchl reached her best singles ranking of world number 409. On 21 October 1991, she peaked at world number 183 in the doubles rankings. Her only WTA Tour main draw appearance came at the 1991 Milan Ladies Open, where she partnered with Lubomira Bacheva in the doubles event.

ITF Finals

Singles (0–1)

Doubles (4–1)

References

External links
 

1967 births
Living people
West German female tennis players
German female tennis players
Medalists at the 1991 Summer Universiade
Universiade bronze medalists for Germany
Universiade medalists in tennis